Ukhalad, also known as Ukhalad, Post Office - Pimpari Deshmukh , Pin Code - 431402   Tq - Parbhani  District - Parbhani, in Maharashtra, India.

In this village some Electricity Problems.

Some God temples are there - Khandoba , Omkareshwar , Vitthal- Rukhminee, Hanuman mandir, Mahadev .etc

Rajmata Punyashlok Ahilyabai holkar Sabhagrah has been available in these village.
In village overall cast People are living and friendly co-operate to which other.

Demography
According to the 2011 census of India, Ukhalad had a population of 3069, of which 1770 were male and 1599 were female. The average sex ratio of the village was 903, which was lower than the Maharashtra state average of 929. The literacy rate was 70.52% compared to 82.3% for the state. Male literacy rate was 79% while female literacy rate was 60%.

Geography and Transport
Following table shows distance of Ukhalad from some of major cities.

References 

Villages in Parbhani district